This article documents the timeline of the COVID-19 pandemic in Pakistan.

January 2020

27 January 

 Pakistan's least populated but largest province, Balochistan, started taking steps to prevent the spread of this virus. The provincial government constituted a 14-member technical committee.

29 January 

 On 29 January 2020, four Pakistani students studying in China were tested positive for COVID-19.

February 2020

12 February 

 It was confirmed that all four of the students had recovered on 12 February 2020.

14 February 

 Two other Pakistani students recovered on 14 February after being hospitalised in Guangzhou.

23 February 

 Pakistan closed its border to travellers from Iran until 7 March at the Taftan border, after 43 cases were reported during the coronavirus pandemic in Iran.

26 February 

 On 26 February, Zafar Mirza, the Prime Minister's Special Assistant on Health, stated in a tweet: "I can confirm first two cases of coronavirus in Pakistan. Both cases were taken care of according to clinical standard protocols & both of them are stable."
 The first patient was a student at the University of Karachi, Karachi in Sindh province. The second patient is from the federal territory of the country. Both patients had recently returned from Iran.

29 February 

 The number of positive cases in Pakistan doubles to four.
 Within less than a week of the first two cases, Pakistan confirmed three more cases, including a case in Pakistan's capital, Islamabad and also in Rawalpindi, Punjab.

March 2020

2 March 

 The fifth case was reported on 2 March 2020, from the federal area of the country, of a 45-year-old woman from Gilgit, Baltistan, who had also travelled from Iran.
Pakistan also closed its border to travellers from Afghanistan at the Chaman border, due to the outbreak in Afghanistan.

4 March 

 After confirmed reports of hundreds of cases in neighbouring China, the Pakistan Civil Aviation Authority (CAA) as a security step introduced screening measures at four major airports: Islamabad, Karachi, Lahore and Peshawar.

6 March 

 Murtaza Wahab announced that the first patient in Karachi had fully recovered and was later discharged from hospital after testing negative.

7 March 

 Pakistan re-opened its border to travellers from Iran at the Taftan border, after 14 days of closure.

8 March 

 Pakistan confirmed its seventh case of COVID-19, also in Karachi.

9 March 

 The next day, Pakistan reported nine new cases in Karachi, meaning that there was a total of 16 cases of COVID-19, with Sindh having the highest number of cases, 13 altogether.  
 Five of the new patients had travelled to Syria and some others patients had returned from London. 
Pakistan also extended its closure of its border with Afghanistan at the Chaman border for at least another week.

10 March 

 Three new cases were confirmed on 10 March, including one in Hyderabad and the first case in Quetta, Balochistan.
The Sindh Government imposed a temporary ban on marriage halls, lawns, banquets, piyala hotels and tea stalls functioning after 23:15 hours.

11 March 

 76 suspected cases were reported in several districts of Punjab province, including Lahore, Gujranwala, Sargodha, Hafizabad and Lodhran. The Healthcare Department officials informed that ten patients were immediately cleared of the suspicion, while 55 patients were cleared after testing negative. The test result of the remaining 11 suspected patients were not given that day.
 Also on that day, a second case in Gilgit-Baltistan was confirmed in Skardu. The patient is a 14-year-old. 
 The Pakistani Consulate in Milan announced the first death of a Pakistani from COVID-19 in Brescia, Italy.

12 March 

 There was a third case found in Gilgit-Baltistan, a 31-year-old resident of Shigar district, who had a travel history of Iran. The spokesman said that the patient is under treatment at the Skardu hospital. On the same day, Murtaza Wahab informed that the second patient of the virus have been completely recovered.

 Pakistan later identified a positive case of a Pakistani national at the Torkham border, on 12 March. It was reported that it was a Pakistani embassy employee from Kabul.
 The Government of Sindh also announced that the remaining PSL matches at National Stadium, Karachi would be held behind closed doors, on 12 March.

13 March 

 The Sindh Health Department identified a 52-year-old patient as positive, which marked the first case of local disease transmission, as the patient had travelled from Islamabad. 
 24 of the 27 suspected cases in Khyber Pakhtunkwa were also cleared that day. 
 From 13 March, Pakistan stopped all international flights, except those at Islamabad, Karachi and Lahore airports.
 President Dr. Arif Alvi in a special tweet, advised the public to avoid participation in mass gatherings, handshaking or hugging in addition to taking other precautionary measures if they observe symptoms of flu or coronavirus infection.
 Shafqat Mahmood that at the National Security Council meeting with PM Imran Khan, it was decided that all schools and universities would be closed until 5 April.
 Chief Minister of Sindh, Syed Murad Ali Shah, announced the closure of all educational institutes in Sindh until 30 March, which was later extended until 30 May.
 The Government of Khyber Pakhtunkhwa also announced to close all educational institutes until 31 March and postponed all festivals and events until further notice as a preventive measure, though no confirmed case has been reported yet in Khyber Pakhtunkhwa.
 The Gilgit-Baltistan Government declared medical emergency in the province after more cases of  coronavirus reported. Educational institutes are further closed until 31 March as a preventive measure.
 The Sindh provincial government, who announced on 13 March that remaining matches of the 2020 Pakistan Super League (PSL), scheduled in Karachi, would be played behind closed doors. 
Similarly, Pakistan Cricket Board (PCB) offered international players participating in PSL to leave for their home countries (if they wish so), while PSL continues as per schedule. 10 international players and one international staff member opted to leave the tournament. 
The Final match in Lahore, was rescheduled to 18 March instead of 22 March.
 It was announced that Pakistan would completely seal its land border with Afghanistan and its land border with Iran from 16 March for at least two weeks. It will also close all land borders, including the China-Pakistan border with China from 16 March.
 The total number of cases rose to 28, with seven new cases in Taftan.

14 March 

 Pakistan Day Parade, scheduled to be held on 23 March, was cancelled.
 The number of cases rose to 31. All three new patients were found positive in Karachi.
On 14 March, the local Government of Azad Kashmir declared a health emergency after a meeting of the National Security Council. It also announced closure of educational institutions until 6 April and secondary examinations were postponed. AJK Prime Minister Raja Farooq Haider also stated that screening mechanisms were installed at all 11 points of entry while quarantine facilities were being established in all 10 districts.

15 March 

 The total patients reached 76 in Sindh. Out of these, 2 had recovered and the remaining 74 were being kept in isolation.
 50 people who arrived in Sukkur from the Taftan border had tested positive.
 Five cases were announced in Karachi, including a second local transmission of the coronavirus in Sindh, while the other three had a travel history of Saudi Arabia and one had a local travel history of Balochistan. There was also one new case in Islamabad Capital Territory.
 Lahore Health Secretary Mohammad Usman confirmed the first case of coronavirus was found in Lahore, Punjab.
 13 tests from Sukkur came back positive among the pilgrims returning from the Taftan border and were kept in quarantine after being suspected cases.
 Total cases reached 53 in Pakistan, the day recorded the highest number of new cases so far with a total of 19 in a single. 34 were from Sindh.

16 March 
 83 new cases of virus were confirmed raising the toll to 136.
 Of these new cases, 15 were confirmed in Dera Ismail Khan, who had returned from Taftan and were kept in quarantine in Darazinda, Dera Ismail Khan.

17 March 

 A total of 119 positive cases in Sukkur were confirmed on 17 March.
 52 new cases were announced. The total number of cases in Pakistan rose to 237.
 The knockout fixtures (both Semi Finals and Final) of Pakistan Super League (PSL) were indefinitely postponed due to the sudden spike in coronavirus cases in Pakistan.
Cardinal Joseph Coutts of the Catholic Church implored the faithful to follow proper measures to prevent the spread of the coronavirus and encouraged interfaith solidarity amidst the pandemic:

18 March 

 A total of 302 positive cases were confirmed in Pakistan on 18 March.
Azad Kashmir reported its first case.
The provinces of Sindh and Gilgit-Baltistan saw an increase of cases by 36 and 10 respectively.
A patient from Hyderabad was discharged after recovering in Sindh province, making the total number of recovered cases 5.
The first two deaths due to the virus in the country were confirmed. Both were reported from the province of Khyber Pakhtunkhwa, the first being a 50-year-old man who had recently from Saudi Arabia to Mardan District after performing Umrah in Mecca, while the second victim was a 36-year-old from Hangu District. Both had been hospitalised in Peshawar.

19 March 

 The cases doubled by more than half from 33 to 80 in Punjab; and from 23 to 81 in Balochistan on 19 March. 
 The rise in cases led the provincial government of Balochistan to declare a health emergency and impose a ban on public transport. The provincial government spokesperson Liaquat Shahwani stated that a relief package will be provided to the employees of transport companies.
 With a total of 159 new cases, the number confirmed cases jumped to 461.

20 March 

 On 20 March, the first death was reported in Sindh. 
 The patient was a 77-year-old who had acquired the virus through local transmission. The patient was a cancer survivor and had other underlying medical problems such as hypertension and diabetes.
 While in other provinces, the increase in number of new cases was lower compared to the past few days at 34 and the tally stood at 495.
On 20 March, the Palestinian Health Ministry announced a new case in Salfit Governorate, Palestine, which originated from Pakistan.

21 March 

 On 21 March, all international flights were suspended for two weeks. The Civil Aviation Authority stated, “[The] government of Pakistan has decided to suspend operation of all international passenger, chartered and private flights to Pakistan, effective from March 21 till April 4”.
 Screening started for domestic travelers at Karachi Jinnah Airport on 21 March.
 The Government of Sindh announced a lockdown in the province for 14 days from 23 March, ordering all public transport, markets, offices, shopping malls, restaurants, and public areas to be shut down.
On 21 March, Palestinian sources confirmed the first two cases in Gaza City, Gaza; the two Palestinians had traveled from Pakistan and entered Gaza through Egypt. Once they had tested positive for the virus they were placed in quarantine in Rafah since their arrival on 19 March.
On 21 March, a suspension of all inter-provincial transport in Azad Kashmir for three days was imposed. No public transport vehicles were allowed to either enter or leave the province. It warned that violators would be punished under the Epidemic Diseases Act.
On 21 March, the city administration of Islamabad imposed Section 144 on the region for 15 days. 
All restaurants and shopping malls were ordered to be closed and violators could face legal consequences.

22 March 

 On 22 March, the third death in Khyber Pakhtunkhwa was announced. The first death in Gilgit-Baltistan and Balochistan were also announced on that day, meaning that the number of deaths increased to 6.
The fatality at DHQ Hospital in Gilgit was a doctor.
The number of cases increased to 784 with 138 new cases.
On 22 March, Gilgit-Baltistan went under lockdown for an indefinite period. 
The provincial government suspended intercity transport services. Para-military forces were also tasked to ensure the lockdown.
13 new pilgrims from Taftan via Dera Ghazi Khan were put in quarantine at Mirpur.
DESCON donated 10,000 hand sanitisers to hospitals in Punjab, whereas in Balochistan 26 drivers who transported the positive COVID-19 cases to hospitals were kept in quarantine.
The federal government offered financial assistance to Sindh by allotting the province $10 million from the non-development funds of the World Bank. Imran Ismail, the Governor of Sindh also stated that federal government was taking "vigorous measures" to control the outbreak and that rations will be provided to the families of patients.
Also on the day, the Foreign Minister Shah Mehmood Qureshi raised the issue of external debt faced by the country and how it should be relieved in repayment of loans on the phone with Heiko Maas, the German Foreign Minister. He further stated that sanctions on Iran should be lifted immediately so it could utilize its own resources to fight the ongoing outbreak there.
All inter-district public transport in KP was banned for seven days on 22 March.
On 22 March, Prime Minister Imran Khan urged the United States President Donald Trump to temporarily lift sanctions on Iran. He stated on Twitter, 'I want to appeal to President Trump on humanitarian grounds to lift the sanctions against Iran till the COVID-19 pandemic is over.'
On 22 March, a patient in Zambia had travelled to Pakistan and had contracted COVID-19.
The Foreign Minister Shah Mehmood Qureshi raised the issue of external debt faced by the country and how it should be relieved in repayment of loans on the phone with Heiko Maas, the German Foreign Minister. 
Qureshi reportedly told Maas that united efforts were required for dealing with the pandemic and that debt relief could help Pakistan in better handling of the outbreak in the country. He further stated that sanctions on Iran should be lifted immediately so it could utilise its own resources to fight the ongoing outbreak there. In response, Maas assured him that the issues would be raised at the forthcoming G7 meeting and the European Union Foreign Ministers’ Conference next week. 
He also echoed the need to lift sanctions on Iran on calls with the French Foreign Minister Jean-Yves Le Drian and the Spanish Foreign Minister Arancha Gonzalez on 24 March.
A patient in Zambia had travelled to Pakistan and had contracted COVID-19.

23 March 

On 23 March, many doctors across the nation complained about the lack of proper equipment for battling the virus. A spokesman for Doctors' Union in Khyber Pakhtunkhwa said, "We do not have personal protective equipment (PPE), or goggles, and even [face] masks we are buying from our own funds".
Arrangements were made on the day by the Foreign Office to bring 72 Pakistanis stranded at the Doha International Airport in Doha, Qatar as it had decided to temporarily ban travelers from Pakistan and 14 other countries early in the month. The passengers were subject to strict screening upon arrival. 
Another flight was arranged to bring 150 citizens for the UAE stranded at Dubai and Abu Dhabi International Airport. 
The Sindh Education Minister Saeed Ghani tested positive for the virus and self-quarantined for 14 days that day.
The local Union Council in the Bhara Kahu region was sealed after 11 suspected cases emerged from there on 23 March.
On 23 March, The AJK Prime Minister announced a 3-week lockdown for the region. 
Movement was restricted and special passes were issued for journalists and people travelling under inevitable circumstances while only one person from each family was allowed to go out to get food essentials.

24 March 

The local police detained 472 people in various districts of the province on the day, with 222 of them in Karachi alone and a total of FIRs were registered on 24 March. The cases pertained to hoarding and profiteering of safety masks and hand sanitisers, large gatherings, opening shops and restaurants and travelling in passenger buses.
On 24 March, Azad Kashmir and Sindh provinces went in lockdown until 7 April.
Punjab also went in lockdown on 24 March, but only until 6 April.
In Sindh, the local police detained 472 people in various districts of the province the same day in violation of the lockdown, with 222 of them in Karachi alone and a total of 72 FIRs were registered on 24 March. The cases pertained to hoarding and profiteering of safety masks and hand sanitisers, large gatherings, opening shops and restaurants and travelling in passenger buses. The provincial government of Sindh allowed 640 pilgrims quarantined in Sukkur to return home after being tested negative for the virus. The Chief Minister issued directives for the relevant deputy commissioners to receive the pilgrims on their return and monitor their health conditions for the next 10 days.
The Pakistan Cricket Board, on request from the Sindh Government, agreed to convert its Hanif Mohammad High Performance Centre into a temporary living area for paramedic staff working at the makeshift hospital at Expo Centre, Karachi on 24 March. 
On 24 March, the Peshawar High Court decided to shut down all courts in the province until March 28. Only essential staff were allowed to come to courts with no more than one official in the office. 
Multiple violations of the lockdown in Sindh were observed in several places across the province such as gatherings on the beach, residents being out and major markets, shopping centres, bazaars and restaurants remained open.
On 24 March, the Prime Minister approved a Rs1.2 trillion economic relief package. Of this, a total of Rs150 billion was allotted for low-income groups, particularly laborers while 280 billion rupees ($1.76 billion) was assigned for wheat procurement. Loan interest payments for exporters were deferred temporarily, while a package of 100 billion rupees ($63 million) was provided to support small industries and the agriculture sector. There was also a significant deduction in petroleum prices and the public couple pay electricity and gas bills below a certain amount in installments. 
Under the package the monthly stipend of the Benazir Income Support Programme (BISP) was increased from Rs2,000 to Rs3,000. It was decided that the funds of the government's Ehsaas programme would be distributed among the poor according to the available data of the BISP and through the under progress National Socio-Economic Registry (NSER) of the BISP. The total number of BISP beneficiaries was 5.2 million but the number was increased under the package.
The relief package also included a special package for healthcare professionals. According to which, if a doctor or a paramedic died while treating coronavirus patients, they would be considered martyrs and their families would receive the package that is given to martyrs.
On 24 March, the Balochistan government imposed a complete lockdown in the entire province until 7 April. 
It included a complete ban on public getting out of their homes, all kinds of social and religious gatherings or any public or private event. All public and private offices were ordered closed. Exemptions included essential services such as personnel of hospitals, laboratories and medical stores, law enforcement agencies, people in need of urgent medical care with one attendant, one person per family going out to buy grocery and medicines within the vicinity of their residence and burials of people that had died. 
Only one person was allowed to travel in a private vehicle. Media personnel authorized by concerned media houses and newspaper hawkers were allowed to move freely as well. Public and private telecom companies, essential staff of banks with limited public dealing, defence-related manufacturing industries, food items manufacturing industries and distribution offices, grocery shops, petrol pumps and auto workshops and welfare organizations providing services were given permission to operate. Similar to Gilgit-Baltistan and Islamad, Section 144 was also enforced. 
A state of emergency was imposed in five districts which bordered Iran on 24 March.

25 March 

 On 25 March, several restrictions were imposed in the capital territory of Islamabad. These included closing of the outpatient departments of hospitals, complete bans on intra-city, inter-district and inter-province public transport as well as gatherings in public and private places. 
 Three new recoveries were announced as well as the eighth death in the country. The number of positive cases increased to 1057.
As a result of lockdown violations in Sindh, a task force meeting led by the Chief Minister was held on 25 March to take more stringent measures to ensure that all residents abided by the government orders of. It was resolved that all grocery stores and shops apart from pharmacies and medical stores to remain closed between 8pm and 8 am. 
The Sindh Inspector General of Police, Javed Ahmed Mahar was directed to make measures taken in connection with the lockdown and make certain that people were not allowed to roam freely in the city unnecessarily. Additionally, the Chief Secretary and Karachi Commissioner were ordered to ensure that big factories remained closed during the lockdown and direct banks to keep only important branches operational.
On 25 March, the national government shut the outpatient departments of hospitals in the capital territory to stem the spread of the virus, only the emergency services remained optional. 
The capital's Deputy Commissioner, Hamza Shafqat issued a notification declaring 'a complete ban on intra-city, inter-district and inter-province movement of people by public transport. 
However, the metro bus service will be functional but at a distance of one seat between passengers.' 
Furthermore, gatherings of all kinds at public and private places were banned no one was allowed to move out of their respective union councils.
The local government of Sindh also arranged to launch a mobile service across the province to provide rations to the needy along with daily wagers to those affected by the pandemic. A number was dedicated for the service and those in need could text there. 
Moreover, a warehouse was established for storage of ration bags and a helpline set up for people to register for acquiring the bags. The CM also ordered to release Rs341 million for carrying out administrative work under district administrations and spending on facilities provided to pilgrims.
On 25 March, the provincial health department officials began coronavirus case mapping as per directives by the Chief Minister. He further tasked them with sharing the data with deputy commissioners so necessary measures could be taken to contain the outbreak in their respective areas. 
Orders were also given to improve sampling arrangements, upon which 18 vehicles of the Indus Hospital were dedicated for collecting samples from homes. 
The health officials briefed the Chief Minister about a new machine made at the Wuhan Institute of Virology in China, which could test secretions from the nose instead of testing throat secretion as was the current procedure. At this, the CM directed the provincial Chief Secretary to consult with medical experts whether procuring the machine would be feasible and if they deemed it to be beneficial, place an order for 100 machines. The CM further stated that he would request the federal government for a special aircraft to transport the machines if the government decided to procure them.

26 March 

 On 26 March, 140 new cases were tested positive across Pakistan. One new death was reported in Punjab, meaning that the death toll increased to 9. The total number of cases reached 1197. Meanwhile, the number of recoveries increased by 2.
Sindh Province received 500,000 K N95 masks from China.

27 March 

 On 27 March, Pakistan reported a record number for new cases detected in a single day with 211. 
 Punjab also overtook Sindh as the province with highest number of cases at 490, while two deaths were also reported there. 
 The National Institute of Health (NIH) distributed N95 masks across Sindh, while in Khyber Pakhtunkhwa, screening teams were deputed at all district entry and exit points for screening of visitors of COVID-19 patients.
 In Gilgit-Baltistan, the local government decided that all travellers coming from the Taftan border would be tested for COVID-19. 
On 27 March, the Chinese government handed medical equipments and 10 tonnes of other goods to the Gilgit-Baltistan government to help it fight COVID-19. 
The equipment included five ventilators, 2,000 N95 masks, 200,000 face masks, 2,000 testing kits and medical protective kits.
 The total number of positive cases in the country reached 1408, while 3 patients were discharged, making the recovered cases a total of 26 and two deaths occurred, taking the total number of deaths to 11. 
Screening teams were deputed at all district entry and exit points for screening of visitors of COVID-19 patients in KP.
 The NIH initiated district level trainings of high-dependency unit, isolation and quarantine staff across Punjab.
Making a landmark, the Pakistani Law enforcement presented the Guard of honour as a mark of respect from 27 to 29 March to the doctors and para medical staff fighting on the front lines of the global COVID-19 outbreak across the nation in Sukkur, Quetta, and Dera Islamil Khan. The medical staff of a Mayo hospital in Lahore were given a guard of honor by the Lahore police for their efforts to help Pakistan fight the coronavirus pandemic. 
Observing social distance (home-quarantined) citizens of Pakistan together with celebrities raised white flags on 27 March across Pakistan from their balconies, rooftops expressing love for the doctors and paramedics who are combating without fearing from the epidemic COVID-19 virus.
The PM announced formation of youth force labelled ‘Corona Relief Tigers’ to help government in fight against the spread of coronavirus nationwide on 27 March. The force was distributed across the country and would be used to supply food items to people in their houses in case COVID-19 cases sharply rose in a locality. The recruitment began on 31 March.
On 27 March, public holidays were extended till 5 April in the province while markets and shopping malls were to remain closed till 10 April. 
Ajmal Wazir, the adviser to the CM stated that the government had decided on tax exemption to facilitate the business community and protect jobs with Rs17.5 billion reserved for wheat procurement. 
An amount of Rs8 billion was also approved for district hospitals to enable them by the urgent supplies.

28 March 

 On 28 March, the Foundation set up by the Chinese billionaire Jack Ma and the Alibaba Group sent a second aircraft carrying various medical supplies to Pakistan. The aircraft was received in Karachi with at least 50,000 testing kits, large number of face masks, ventilators and personal protective equipment (PPE), which were combined around two tonnes of supplies worth Rs67 million. 
The same day, Pakistan allowed Thai Airways to resume its flight operation for Islamabad to bring back 175 Pakistanis stranded in Bangkok, Thailand. 
To aid the medical professionals, a textile owner from Lahore offered to manufacture PPE voluntarily and free of cost.
To further enforce lockdown, the Sindh govt restricted movement between 8AM and 5PM, while all grocery stores were ordered to be closed by 5 PM. 
Meanwhile, the Government of Punjab announced a Rs10 billion relief package for financial support of 2.5 million families of daily-wage earners.
Each family was entitled to Rs4,000 financial assistance excluding the beneficiaries of the Benazir Income Support Programme (BISP). The government also decided to remove provincial taxes to the tune of Rs18bn. The CM said that the Punjab government had decided to use its special powers for granting 90-day imprisonment rebate to prisoners in jails across the province which would benefit some 3,100 prisoners. 
Furthermore, the Punjab Infectious Diseases Prevention and Control Ordinance, 2020, was implemented to allow the civil administration and health department to implement government measures with complete ease and under the cover of law. It was also declared that the government would provide a month's additional salary to all healthcare workers across Punjab. 
The Punjab Minister for Finance Hashim Jawan Bakht said that the economic package would also help the health sector and the Provincial Disaster Management Authority (PDMA) cope with the crisis with an immediate funding of Rs11.5 billion. 
Also in the meeting, the CM stated that laboratories around the province would test 3,200 people every day for coronavirus and 10,000 doctors and paramedics were being recruited to fight the pandemic.
On 28 March, Pakistani squash player Azam Khan died of COVID-19 in London, United Kingdom, at the age of 95.

29 March 

 The country reported an additional 118 cases on 29 March, taking the total to 1,526. 
 One death each was reported in the provinces of Sindh and Khyber Pakhtunkhwa, taking the total number of deceased to 13. 
 Khyber Pakhtunkhwa developed and disseminated quarantine discontinuation guidelines. 
 Also on the day, five Pakistani nationals visiting India on medical visas returned home via the Wagah border after being stranded in Noida and New Delhi due to the countrywide 21-day lockdown imposed by the Indian government. 
 As the cases neared 500 in Sindh, the CM of the province said that the data showed 25% of cases were due to local transmission. He stated,  "the local transmission ratio is worrisome and needs to be contained further."
Due to various lockdowns imposed by the regional governments, the goods transport system came to a halt in later March. Thus, the federal government decided on 29 March that highways and roads across the country would remain open to ensure the transportation of goods and also increased the number of freight trains to avert a shortage of food and other essential supplies. Chairing a meeting, the Prime Minister asked the provincial governments to take strict action against hoarders and profiteers who were trying to exploit the ongoing crisis.
On 29 March, the Sindh CM approved a proposal to release about 4,000 convicts from prison in order to prevent the spread of the novel coronavirus outbreak in the province's jails.
The Government of Punjab announced a one-month honorarium for the healthcare workers at the end of March. 
This meant that in case a healthcare worker lost their life, a martyr package was included in a regional government relief package. Medical professionals across the province were also provided with one-month additional salary in recognition of their services.
The KP government approved a Rs32 billion stimulus economic package to provide relief to the masses and the business community amid the coronavirus crisis. 
Provincial Information Minister Ajmal Wazir, announced at a press conference that the relief package include Rs11.4 billion benefiting 1.9 million deserving families, Rs3,000 would be given under the Ehsaas programme and Rs2,000 by the KP government. 
He added that the business community had also been exempted from taxes worth Rs5 billion and the provincial government had ramped up its testing capacity with 500 new diagnostics kits.

30 March 

 On 30 March, the Federal Minister for Science and Technology Chaudhry Fawad Hussain said that locally manufactured ventilators and testing kits would hit the market in the coming days. The coronavirus testing kits were developed by Pakistan's National University of Sciences & Technology (NUST) have been handed to the Drug Regulatory Authority (DRAP) for final approval. While the Pakistan Engineering Council (PEC) developed ventilators, in collaboration with NED University of Engineering and Technology and Pakistan Engineering Board, which were handed over to DRAP later in the week. He also said that the capacity of Pakistan Council of Scientific and Industrial Research (PCSIR) for production of hand sanitizers was enhanced.
By late March, many regions in Pakistan had considered releasing under-trial prisoners to curb the outbreak in jails. However, on 30 March, the Supreme Court refrained high courts and federal and provincial governments to pass any order regarding the release of under-trial prisoners. 
Also on 30 March, the State Minister for Health, Dr Zafar Mirza announced that the Higher Education Commission (HEC) was inviting proposals from researchers, scientists, technicians, manufacturers and other experts that could assist the government in its fight against COVID-19, adding that the commission would provide generous funding to prospective researchers if their ideas are accepted. 
Meanwhile, the Lt. Gen. Afzal said that Sindh had been provided 20,000 testing kits, Punjab 5,000, Balochistan 4,800 and that up to 37,000 kits had been put into reserve. 
The Federal Minister for Inter Provincial Coordination Dr. Fehmida Mirza announced to create a fund to cover all medical expenses of sports persons infected with COVID-19 on that day.
The Federal Minister for Inter Provincial Coordination Dr. Fehmida Mirza on 30 March announced to create fund to cover all medical expenses of sports persons infected with COVID-19 in Pakistan.
On 30 March, the Chief Minister, Syed Murad Ali Shah made public a mobile application, namely the Sindh Relief Initiative, on which welfare organisations could register to work with the provincial government for the distribution of ration among daily-wagers at their doorstep. 
Also on the day, the Mayor of Karachi, Wasim Akhtar designated five cemeteries in the city for burials of those who died due to coronavirus. He said that only a few close relatives of the deceased could enter the cemetery for burial, adding that the body would be brought into the cemetery with protective measures and no last sighting would be allowed. 
The mayor also wrote to the National Disaster Management Authority, the provincial government and the Governor Imran Ismail requesting funds to provide essential equipment and ventilators to Karachi Metropolitan Corporation hospitals. 
The Sindh government issued a circular directing private schools across the province to pay full salaries to its teachers on time the same day. Another directive was also declared for factories and other private entities operating in the province to disburse salaries to their employees by 31 March.
The Chief Minister of KP, Mahmood Khan, announced on 26 March that the government had appointed at least 1,300 new doctors on contractual basis across the province to help stem the spread of coronavirus. The KP Public Service Commission also approved the recruitment of 635 more doctors to join the province's health force.

31 March 

 On 31 March, 82 total recoveries were announced, as well as the 26th death in the country. 
 174 new cases were tested positive, meaning that the total number of positive cases had increased to 2039.
The federal cabinet reviewed and approved the economic relief package on 31 March. The Economic Coordination Committee (ECC) finalised the package, including a Rs100-billion supplementary grant for an Emergency Relief Fund to combat the pandemic. It also approved a special package for relief to 12 million poor families through cash assistance under the Ehsaas Programme, where cash grants would be provided under the Kafalat Programme and emergency cash assistance to the poor on the recommendation of the district administration. The financial assistance was provided for four months as a one-time dispensation. The cash would be provided either in one Rs12,000 installment through Kafalat partner banks, Bank Alfalah and Habib Bank Limited after biometric verification or in two installments of Rs6,000 each.
On 31 March, the provincial government released Rs500 million for upgrading, rehabilitation & establishment of Quarantine centres in the areas of Quetta, Chaman, Taftaan & other areas of Balochistan.
On 31 March, the World Health Organization staff got involved in KP's handling of the outbreak by providing support in terms of data management at district level.
On 31 March, measures were taken in KP province for strengthening the prevention of the outbreak. 
Moreover, the Provincial Disaster Management Authority (PDMA) dispatched 50,000 N95 masks to departments involved in the fight against coronavirus in the province. 
A total of 8,000 surgical kits and caps were also given to the health departments, along with 750 litres of sanitizers and 5,000 protective kits.

April 2020

1 April 

 On 1 April, 252 new cases were confirmed, bringing the total number of cases to 2291. 
 One death each was reported in KP, Punjab and Sindh, meaning that the number of deaths increased to 31.
 On 1 April, Special Assistant on Information and Broadcasting Dr. Firdous Ashiq Awan said that protective kits would be provided to the journalists covering vulnerable areas including quarantine centers. 
 She also announced the launching of an app called COVID-19 Care for Media to help the journalists affected by the virus. 
 Furthermore, newspapers hawkers would also be registered in Ehsaas Emergency Cash program; part of the economic relief package announced by the federal government, as their sales had also been affected due to the outbreak.

2 April 

 On 2 April, 159 new cases were confirmed, bringing the tally to 2450. Four deaths were reported, two from Sindh and one each from KP, and Gilgit increasing the total to 35.
 On 2 April, the Government of Pakistan announced that the Pakistani economy had lost Rs2.5 trillion due to the coronavirus pandemic.
 The Federal Minister for Planning and Development Asad Umar announced that the country was extending the ongoing lockdown for another two weeks until 14 April to curb the spread of the pandemic in the country.

3 April 

 On 3 April, total cases were increased to 2708 after 258 new cases were confirmed. Five deaths were reported.
 The Ministry of Planning estimated that 12.3 million to 18.5 million people will become jobless due to pandemic.

4 April 

 The number of confirmed coronavirus cases have reached 2,686 with 40 fatalities and 83 recoveries being reported from official sources. 
 Following are the number of reported COVID-19 cases in provinces: Punjab (1069), Sindh (830), Khyber-Pakhtunkhwa (343) Balochistan (175), AJK/GB (11/190) and Islamabad Capital Territory (68)

6 April 

 Special Assistant to the Prime Minister on Social Protection and Poverty Alleviation, Dr Sania Nishtar on Monday said that govt has received over 30.5 million SMS on 8171 for financial assistance of Rs12,000 cash grant under Ehsaas Emergency Cash Programme in the wake of coronavirus pandemic.

8 April 

 Total confirmed cases jumped to 4,265 including, Sindh 1,036 cases, Punjab 2,166 cases, 527 in Khyber Pakhtunkhwa, 212 in Balochistan, 83 in Islamabad Capital Territory, 213 in Gilgit-Baltistan and 28 cases in AJK claiming 61 lives in the country so far.
 The payments under Ehsaas Emergency Cash Programme, introduced by the federal government to help the poor and deserving people facing hardship because of the coronavirus lockdown has been started. According to media reports the Ehsaas Emergency Cash Programme will help 12 million families by providing them financial assistance of Rs. 12,000 per family.

9 April 

 2,136 patients have been tested positive for the epidemic in Punjab, 1128 in Sindh, 470 in Khyber Pakhtunkhwa, 114 in Gilgit-Baltistan, 135 in Balochistan, 98 in Islamabad and 32 in Azad Kashmir.So far, 630 patients have recovered in the country while 25 are in critical condition.
 Special Assistant to the Prime Minister on National Health Services, Dr. Zafar Mirza Thursday announced that Drug Regulatory Authority of Pakistan (DRAP) has allowed the local production of raw material of chloroquine as part of efforts to cope with coronavirus challenge.
 In a statement, he said the DRAP has also permitted clinical trials of plasma therapy for coronavirus treatment, Electronic/Radio channel reported. The Special Assistant said the drug regulatory body has also allowed the clinical trials of locally manufactured ventilators.
 More than fifty companies have been allowed to produce sanitizers to contain the spread of the pandemic. The companies will prepare quality sanitizers as per the directions of the World Health Organization.

10 April 

 The number of confirmed COVID-19 cases in Pakistan has risen to 4,601 as of 10 April.
 Increase of 279 new cases in the last 24 hours.
 The most affected province due to COVID-19 virus is Punjab 2,279, followed by Sindh 1,128.
 The Ministry of National Health Services, Regulation and Coordination (MoNHSR&C) and the National Institute of Health (NIH) are deliberating on strategies to scale-up COVID-19 laboratory testing from the current capacity of 6,000 tests per day to 20,000 tests per day.
 Infection prevention and control (IPC) at all sites (health facilities, isolation facilities and the quarantine sites) is still a big challenge.
 The Drug Regulatory Authority of Pakistan (DRAP) has granted permission for conducting clinical trials of plasma therapy for COVID-19 patients and trials of locally produced ventilators in Pakistan.
 Pakistan has pledged to contribute $3 million in South Asian Association for Regional Cooperation (Saarc) COVID-19 Emergency Fund to support regional efforts in the fight against the global pandemic.
 Prime Minister Imran Khan on Thursday said the decision about easing the countrywide lockdown will be taken after seeking inputs from all the provinces on 14th of this month.
 The government has decided to extend the suspension of international and domestic flight operation till April 21, the Aviation Division spokesperson said on Thursday.
 Pakistan International Airlines (PIA) on Thursday issued schedule for special international flights. The national carrier will continue its flight operation from April 10 to 13 to bring back the stranded Pakistanis from abroad.

11 April 

 The number of confirmed COVID-19 cases in Pakistan has risen to 4,788 as of 10 April. Increase of 187 new cases in the last 24 hours.
 The most affected province due to COVID-19 virus is Punjab 2,336, followed by Sindh 1,214.
 The first batch of Point of Care (PoC) testing equipment has arrived at WHO Country Office Islamabad. This equipment will be handed over to the Ministry of Health.
 The National Disaster Management Authority (NDMA) dispatched personal protective equipment (PPE) for healthcare professionals in Balochistan. The PPE include N-95 masks, caps, gloves, goggles, face shields, shoe covers and gowns.
 The World Health Organization (WHO) warned countries on Friday to be cautious about lifting restrictions introduced to curb the spread of the new coronavirus and voiced alarm it was taking hold in Africa.
 The European Union has decided to support and strengthen the capacities and engagement of civil society organizations in Pakistan with the purpose of mobilizing communities towards mitigating social and economic effects of the COVID-19 outbreak.
 The Ministry of Science and Technology has offered to repair out-of-order ventilators in government and private hospitals and clinics free of charge, provided these healthcare centers promise that they would provide the repaired equipment to coronavirus patients free of cost as the country is witnessing a medical emergency.
 The National Disaster Management Authority (NDMA) brings its procured consignment of medical goods and protective equipment from China through Pakistan International Airlines (PIA) aircraft.
 To support the employment of workers in the face of economic challenges posed by COVID-19, the State Bank of Pakistan (SBP) has introduced a temporary refinance scheme for businesses to discourage them from laying off workers in the wake of the pandemic.

12 April 

 The number of confirmed COVID-19 cases in Pakistan has risen to 5,038 as of 10 April. Increase of 250 new cases in the last 24 hours.
 The most affected province due to COVID-19 virus is Punjab 2,425, followed by Sindh 1,318.
 The National Disaster Management Authority is dispatching additional Personal Protection Equipment for doctors and health workers of 202 hospitals of Sindh.
 More than 1.5 million families will get severely affected if the lockdown continues for two months in Balochistan.
 The public sector hospitals of the Islamabad city are again considering extending the closure of Outdoor Patient Departments for one month due to possible high risk of novel coronavirus spread from the facilities, The Nation learnt on Saturday.
 The district administration of Rawalpindi has established a 120-bed quarantine facility at Shahbaz Sharif Sports Complex located on Sixth Road.
 Minister for Aviation Ghulam Sarwar Khan on Saturday said the government would bring back 4,000 Pakistanis stranded across the world following Covid-19outbreak through special flights.
 Chairman National Disaster Management Authority (NDMA) Lieutenant General Muhammad Afzal said Pakistan has the testing facility available for 75-days to diagnose Coronavirus or COVID-19 pandemic disease.
 Prime Minister Imran Khan on Saturday said the incentives announced by the central bank for the business community would prevent massive unemployment in the county because of the economic downturn caused by the coronavirus pandemic as the health minister warned against easing restrictions at the current stage of the outbreak.

13 April 

 The number of confirmed COVID-19 cases in Pakistan has risen to 5,377 as of 13 April. Increase of 336 new cases in the last 24 hours. The most affected province due to COVID-19 virus is Punjab 2,594, followed by Sindh 1,411. Male (74%) are more affected than the females (26%). The most affected are the young age group of age range 20 to 39 years (36%). In Pakistan only 32% of the affected population are over 50 years of age. Over 100 districts in Pakistan have reported at least one case of COVID-19. The National Disaster Management Authority is dispatching additional Personal Protection Equipment for doctors and health workers of 202 hospitals of Sindh. The district administration of Rawalpindi has established a 120-bed quarantine facility at Shahbaz Sharif Sports Complex located on Sixth Road. Minister for Aviation Ghulam Sarwar Khan on Saturday said the government would bring back 4,000 Pakistanis stranded across the world following Covid-19outbreak through special flights. Chairman National Disaster Management Authority (NDMA) Lieutenant General Muhammad Afzal said Pakistan has the testing facility available for 75-days to diagnose Coronavirus or COVID-19 pandemic disease.

14 April 

 The number of confirmed COVID-19 cases in Pakistan has risen to 5,719 as of 14 April. Increase of 342 new cases in the last 24 hours. The most affected province due to COVID-19 virus is Punjab 2,826, followed by Sindh 1,452. World Health Organization (WHO) has provided National Disaster Management Authority (NDMA) with 15 PCR machines and test kits which are eligible to carry 15,000 tests. The International Monetary Fund (IMF) on Monday noted the rapid pace at which COVID-19 has been spreading in Pakistan and acknowledged the Rs1.2 trillion relief package announced by the government. Prime Minister Imran Khan on Monday inaugurated a national broadcast education channel to mitigate the loss faced by the students due to the closure of educational institutions till May 31 in the wake of coronavirus pandemic. Prominent non-governmental organisations (NGOs) in the country have generated Rs4 billion for relief work during the COVID-19 health emergency, giving out rations, protective gear and medical items as well as carrying out food drives for the needy, daily-wage workers, the transgender community and religious minorities. Pakistan has decided to keep its western and eastern borders completely closed for two more weeks to tackle the spread of coronavirus in the country. With 5,500 cases of COVID-19 and around 100 deaths reported across the country, the medical fraternity fears that the health sector may collapse as a large number of healthcare providers have been infected.

15 April 

 The number of confirmed COVID-19 cases in Pakistan has risen to 5,988 as of 15 April. Increase of 269 new cases in the last 24 hours. The most affected province due to COVID-19 virus is Punjab 2,945, followed by Sindh 1,518. Civil Aviation Authority (CAA) has issued new COVID-19 prevention guidelines, according to which every plane will be disinfected before boarding starts. The flights will ensure the provision of PPE and temperature check of every passenger with an interval of 90 minutes. U.N. Secretary-General Antonio Guterres warned Tuesday that the world is facing “a dangerous epidemic of misinformation” about COVID-19 and announced a U.N. campaign to flood the internet with facts and science to counter what he called “a poison” that is putting lives at risk. The government has extended the prevailing lockdown for another two weeks with some essential industries being allowed to reopen. With the novel coronavirus pandemic continuing to exact a heavy toll on Pakistan's aviation sector, the country's national flag on Tuesday announced it would continue special flights to ferry citizens stranded in various parts of the world. With the number of novel coronavirus (COVID-19) cases soaring past 800 in the province and a lockdown into its fourth week, the provincial government of KP on Tuesday issued a comprehensive strategy to mitigate the impact the pandemic is having on the economy.

16 April 

It was reported that 58% of the cases had been locally transmitted in Pakistan.
At least 1,700 pilgrims returning from Iran were quarantined at a centre in Multan on April 16.

18 April 

 Khyber Pakhtunkhwa crossed the mark of 1,000 confirmed cases on 18 April.

21 April 

 A report released on 21 April stated that over 2,000; 27% of the total positive cases in the country were linked to the religious congregation of the Tablighi Jamaat.

22 April 

 Pakistan crossed a critical mark of the outbreak in the country as the total number of cases surged above 10,000 on 22 April. 
 In late April, a group of senior doctors in Pakistan, and abroad, wrote to religious leaders and to the prime minister "pleading" not to open mosques during ramadan, particularly as 80% of the people attending would be mostly in their 60s and 70s. This could result in an "explosion of Covid-19".

24 April 

 On 24 April, the federal government once again extended the lockdown in the country, this time until 9 May.

25 April 

 Khyber Pakhtunkhwa (KP) traders’ association Sarhad Chamber of Commerce (SCC), were not same page with the government, on one hand was concerned despite business losses on account of lock down other arm of the government cutting electricity supplies on the other hand trading associations not willing to co-operate government's lockdown timing restrictions during Ramzan to recoup their losses.
 Social distancing being important step to be followed by all to combat COVID-19 pandemic, some of the religious activities came under critical lens in Pakistan. Returning devotees from Iran, a Tablighi Jamaat religious gathering and prayer congregations became a cause of concern due to their potential to exacerbate the outbreak in the country.

27 April 

 The governor of Sindh, Imran Ismail revealed on 27 April that he had tested positive for COVID-19 via twitter.

29 April 

 Some government programs were mainted through the crisis in order to keep people employed. For example, the Plant for Pakistan reforestation program was maintained through the pandemic employing 60,000 people.

May 2020

7 May 

 COVID-19 had infected more than 500 Pakistani healthcare workers. 
 In a knee jerk panic response, a good number of maternity wards of various hospitals were closed down since some health workers got infected while attending maternity wards putting already challenged reproductive health of Pakistani women in more risk.

9 May 

 Lockdown ended in Pakistan.

18 May 

 On 18 May, 16 new fatalities were recorded in Khyber Pakhtunkhwa, bringing the death toll to 334 in the province.

19 May 

 A further 11 fatalities were reported in Khyber Pakhtunkhwa, bringing the death toll to 345. 
 On 19 May, it was reported that a 64-year-old patient in Hyderabad, Sindh, recovered after undergoing plasma therapy.

21 May 

 On 21 May, the number of positive cases passed 48,000, after 2,193 new cases were announced. 32 new fatalities were recorded. The death toll reached 1,017, as the number of recoveries reached 14,155. Planning Minister Asad Umar said that Pakistan could test 25,000 people a day.

22 May 

 On 22 May, Pakistan International Airlines Flight 8303 crashed on approach to Jinnah International Airport, killing 97 of the 99 people on board. The crash further stretched health resources, and led to a three-day long decline in testing.

29 May 

 On 29 May, it was announced that 900 children under the age of 10 had tested positive in Sindh. Most cases were asymptomatic.

June 2020

1 June 

 On June 1, 2020, it was reported that Punjab's chief minister, Usman Buzdar, had been told in a summary that there were an estimated 670,000 cases of COVID-19, most of them asymptomatic, in Lahore and that COVID-19 had reached every single area of Lahore.

2 June 

 On 2 June, it was reported that mango exports had declined due to the COVID-19 pandemic.

3 June 

 In early June, after testing began to pick up once again, case numbers began rising far faster, after levels of new cases in 24 hours breaking 3,000 on May 31, June 3 was the first day in which more than 4,000 people tested positive for COVID-19. The ratio of positive cases to tests also increased, hovering around 20 - 25% in the first few days of June.

5 June 

 On 5 June, the Pakistani Government announced plans to privatize a number of state-run industries, including the state-run Pakistan Steel Mills. Such actions led to the lay off and subsequent unemployment of over 9300 employees.

13 June 

 On 13 June 2020, veteran Pakistani cricketer and former captain of Pakistan national cricket team Shahid Afridi confirmed that he has been tested positive for COVID-19 through his official Twitter account after experiencing severe body pain since 11 June 2020. He was actively involved in social service helping people across Balochistan in the remote areas during the lockdown imposed in the country prior to contracting with the coronavirus.
 On 13 June, VOA news reported that Pakistan funded Rs 1.66 billion (more than US$10 million) to its premier security spy agency ISI for its expertise on tracking and tracing to help fight the pandemic in Pakistan. Many human rights activists and medical professionals, though, worried this could lead to a "militarization of a health emergency" and an increased stigma towards infected people.

16 June 

 According to news report of Benazir Shah in Arab News, as of 16 June at least 97 members of national and provincial assemblies across political lines tested positive for COVID-19 and six of them succumbed to death.

17 June 

 On 17 June 2020, Shaheed Sikandarabad District, Sherani District, and Barkhan District, all in Balochistan, all recorded their first case of COVID-19. This meant that every single district in the four provinces of Pakistan had at least one confirmed case of COVID-19.

20 June 

 On 20 June, Pakistan's Ministry of Interior announced that the Torkham and Spin Boldak borders would open for six days a week under strict health measures.

22 June 

 On 22 June, Pakistan opened its border crossings with Afghanistan, allowing exports for the first time in three months.

July 2020

15 July 

 On 15 July, Pakistan allowed Afghan exports to India through the Wagah border, after taking COVID-19 measures.

17 July 

 On 17 July, China applauded the resumption of trade relations between Afghanistan and Pakistan after five land crossings had opened. The five land crossings were Torkham, Chaman, Ghulam Khan, Angur Ada and Dand-e-Patan.

December 2020

31 December 

 On 31 December 2020, Minister for Science and Technology Fawad Chaudhry said that Pakistan will purchase 1.2 million doses of coronavirus vaccine from China's Sinopharm.

January 2021

7 January 

 On 7 January 2021, Parliamentary Secretary for Ministry of National Health Services Dr Nausheen Hamid said that Pakistan is expected to get the first COVID-19 vaccine shipment by the end of the month.

9 January 

 On 9 January 2021, Islamabad got its first coronavirus vaccination centre after the government established the facility in Tarlai area of the federal capital.

10 January 

 On 10 January 2021, the government's National Command and Operation Center (NCOC) opened registrations for frontline healthcare workers, who will receive the first doses of the COVID-19 vaccine. Staff in both public and private health facilities will be vaccinated, NCOC announced on its website.

16 January 

 On 16 January 2021, AstraZeneca's COVID-19 vaccine was approved for emergency use in Pakistan as the Chinese vaccine was awaiting approval from the Drug Regulatory Authority of Pakistan (DRAP). Faisal Sultan added that Pakistan had adequate cold chain facilities for most kinds of vaccines.

18 January 

 On 18 January 2021, The Drug Regulatory Authority of Pakistan (DRAP) approved the Sinopharm BIBP vaccine for emergency use.

21 January 

 On 21 January 2021, Pakistan's Foreign Minister Shah Mehmood Qureshi said that China agreed to provide half a million doses of the Chinese Sinopharm BIBP vaccine free of cost to Pakistan by January 31.

31 January 
 On 31 January 2021, it was announced that 17 million doses of the AstraZeneca vaccine would be provided to Pakistan by COVAX.

February 2021

1 February 
 On 1 February 2021, Pakistan received the first vaccine doses from China.

12 February 
 On 12 February 2021, Pakistan approved the emergency use of the Convidecia vaccine developed by CanSino Biologics.

24 February 
 On 24 February 2021, Pakistan announced all coronavirus restrictions would be lifted from 15 March.

March 2021

5 March 
 By 5 March 2021, 197,000 vaccine does had been administered in Pakistan.

6 March 
 On 6 March 2021, Nadhim Zahawi announced that Pakistan will get 17 million COVID-19 vaccine doses from the United Kingdom.

See also 

 COVID-19 pandemic in Pakistan
2020 Tablighi Jamaat coronavirus hotspot in Pakistan
 Timeline of the COVID-19 pandemic
 COVID-19 pandemic in Asia
 COVID-19 pandemic in South Asia

References

COVID-19 pandemic in Pakistan
Pakistan